Dave Murphy (born November 26, 1954) is an American businessman and politician.

From Greenville, Wisconsin, Murphy is the owner of a fitness center and went to the University of Wisconsin–Fox Valley. In November 2012, Murphy was elected to the Wisconsin State Assembly as a Republican.

In December 2016, Murphy pressured the University of Wisconsin–Madison to cancel a course entitled "The Problem of Whiteness" and fire the lecturer teaching it.

References

External links
 Legislature website

Living people
People from Greenville, Wisconsin
Businesspeople from Wisconsin
1954 births
21st-century American politicians
Republican Party members of the Wisconsin State Assembly